Down by Love is a 2016 French drama film directed by Pierre Godeau.

Plot
Based on the life of Sorour Arbabzadeh and Florent Goncalves in 2010, a young woman, Anna Amari, is detained at a prison for women in Versailles, where she encounters Jean Firmino, the prison director. She is sentenced to nine years in prison and they begin an illegal relationship which brings the attention of the authorities onto them.

Cast

 Guillaume Gallienne as Jean Firmino
 Adèle Exarchopoulos as Anna Amari
  as Elise Firmino
 Marie Rivière as Anna's mother
 Aliénor Poisson as Louise Firmino
 Cyrielle Martinez as Zoé
 Selma Mansouri as Sonia
 Sabila Moussadek as Aïda
 Julie Moulier as Pilar
 Marie Berto as Béatrice
 Amir El Kacem as Mam's
 Soumaye Bocoum as Mélanie
 Ahlem Lahouel as Ahlem
 Nade Dieu as The captain
 Anne Loiret as Anna's lawyer
 Maryline Even as Co-prisoner at Fleury
 Olivier Foubert as The teacher
 Aude Briant as The secretary

Critical response
On review aggregator website Rotten Tomatoes, Down by Love has an approval rating of 33%, based on 6 reviews, with an average rating of 4.7/10.

References

External links
 

2016 films
French drama films
2010s French-language films
Drama films based on actual events
Films based on non-fiction books
Films scored by Robin Coudert
StudioCanal films
Women in prison films
2016 drama films
2010s French films